Tamar (1696 – 12 April 1746) was a Georgian royal princess of the Bagrationi dynasty, a daughter of King Vakhtang VI of Kartli, of the Mukhranian branch, and the second wife of King Teimuraz II, of the Kakhetian branch. The union with Teimuraz made her queen consort of Kakheti (1729–1736, 1738–1744). She was queen regnant of Kartli (1744–1746) in her own right under the name Tamar II.

Biography
Tamar was born to then-Prince Royal Vakhtang of Kartli and his Circassian wife Rusudan in 1696. Vakhtang ruled Kartli intermittently from 1703 until being forced by the Ottoman invasion into exile to the Russian Empire in 1724. At the age of 16, on 2 February 1712, Tamar married, as his second wife, Prince Royal Teimuraz of Kakheti, a younger brother of King David II of Kakheti (Imam Quli Khan). The wedding was lavishly celebrated in Vakhtang's capital city of Tbilisi and then in Manavi, Kakheti. The couple's subsequent life was marred by a civil strife, attacks by the Lezgians, and invasions from the Ottoman Empire and Persia. Teimuraz twice acceded to the throne of Kakheti, from 1729 to 1736 and again, from 1738 to 1744, when he resigned Kakheti to his son, Heraclius II, and established himself on the vacated throne of his in-laws in Kartli.

During these years of turmoil, Tamar herself became involved in war and politics. During Teimuraz's absence at the headquarters of his Iranian suzerain, Nader Shah, in Kandahar from 1736 to 1738 Tamar counterbalanced the regency of Teimuraz's Muslim brother, Ali Mirza. She used her influence and the services of Prince Givi Cholokashvili to disrupt Ali Mirza's design for a revolt against Iran, thereby saving her husband and son from Nader's imminent revenge and eventually forcing Ali Mirza out of Kakheti in 1738. When Nader again summoned Teimuraz to his camp at Derbend in 1741, Tamar accompanied her husband, at the shah's request, as a proof of loyalty. Teimuraz succeeded in securing the shah's support for his dynastic ambitions in both Kartli and Kakheti, but this also invited a rebellion led by Prince Givi Amilakhvari. After three years of inconclusive fighting, the rebels were eventually defeated by Teimuraz, and Tamar in person accepted the courteous surrender of Amilakhvari in Surami in 1745. From 1744 until her death in 1746, Tamar was a co-regnant with her husband in Kartli, while their son, Heraclius, began his lengthy reign in Kakheti. Tamar was buried at the cathedral of Living Pillar in Mtskheta. After her death, Teimuraz married his third wife, Ana-Khanum Baratashvili.

Children
Teimuraz and Tamar were the parents of one son and three daughters:

 Heraclius II (November 7, 1720 – January 11, 1798), the king of Kakheti and of Kartli and Kakheti.
 Princess Ketevan (Khoreshan), who married, in 1737 at Mashhad, Adil Shah of Iran (1719–1749).
 Princess Elene (fl. 1743–1784), who married, c. 1743, Prince Zaza Tsitsishvili.
 Princess Ana  (1720 – December 4, 1788), who married firstly, in 1744, Prince Dimitri Orbeliani (died 1776) and secondly Prince Ioane Orbeliani (c. 1702 – 1781).

Ancestry

Bibliography
Toumanoff, Cyrille: Les Dynasties de la Caucasie Chrétienne de l'Antiquité jusqu'au XIXe siècle. Tables généalogiques et chronologique, Rome, 1990.

References

1696 births
1746 deaths
Queens consort from Georgia (country)
House of Mukhrani
17th-century people from Georgia (country)
18th-century people from Georgia (country)
Kings of Kartli
Eastern Orthodox monarchs
17th-century women from Georgia (country)
18th-century women from Georgia (country)
Queens consort of Kakheti
Queens regnant in Europe
18th-century women rulers